"Nuit de folie" (literally  "Night of madness") is a 1988 popular song recorded by French pop duet Début de Soirée. It was their debut single from their album Jardins d'enfants and was released in June 1988. In France, it became the summer hit of the year, topping the chart for over two months. It was re-released in 2000 in a remixed version, but it did not reach success.

Background
The song, written and composed by both members of the duet, was especially created to become a summer hit, although the song was actually released for the first time in 1984 as a B-side, but passed unnoticed at the time. It was very difficult to find a record company, because nobody believed in the potential of the song, but a contract was eventually signed with Sony. In 1988, the song was also much promoted by the band in many TV shows. According to Elia Habib, an expert of French charts, the song is characterized by a "rapid and lively rhythm, a very simple refrain therefore easy to remember, a tune that becomes embedded in the eardrums, lyrics referring to summer festive atmosphere". It also contains a brief bridge sung in a rap version, just before the last refrain. The song composed in 1984 had no success at first. The arrangements of the best known version of 1988 come from German singer Patty Ryan's song "You're My Love, You're My Life".

The duet's second single, "La Vie la nuit", released in December 1988, used around the end of the song a sample from the introduction of "Nuit de folie".

Critical reception
A review in Pan-European magazine Music & Media described "Nuit de folie" as a production from the "French equivalent of Modern Talking" and "a typical good-time summer hit" with "an inescapable hook and a nice pop rap in the middle (no.1 in France). A massive European hit!"

Music video
In the music video for "Nuit de folie", the two singers perform a choreography on "shimmering  backgrounds", in an "astonishing variety of head to foot positions". They are accompanied by three women, each with a plain dress in a different colour. During the last refrain, two couples are formed, and the obese woman remains alone. The music video is now considered old-fashioned and in an interview, both singers admitted that they do not like to see it aired on TV because they find it antiquated.

Chart performances
In France, "Nuit de folie" entered the singles chart at number 39 on 11 June 1988, climbed quickly and reached number one in its sixth and stayed atop for consecutive nine weeks. After being dislodged by Elsa and Glenn Medeiros's hit "Un Roman d'amitié (Friend You Give Me a Reason)", it stayed for other five weeks at number two, and totalled 22 weeks in the top ten and 30 weeks in the top 50. It was certified Platinum disc by the Syndicat National de l'Édition Phonographique for over one million units. In Belgium (Wallonia), it topped the chart for non consecutive seven weeks, in alternance with "Un Roman d'amitié (Friend You Give Me a Reason)", and remained in the top three for 14 weeks. In addition, it was a top ten hit in Flanders and a top 25 in the Netherlands. On the European Hot 100 Singles, it debuted at number 89 on 2 July 1988, reached a peak of number three in its 13th week, and fall of the chart after 26 weeks of presence, 11 of them in the top ten. 

The song was later released in remixed versions for discothèques, first in 1995, then in 2000; however, both versions were commercial failures.

Uses in the media
The song was covered by a band in Fabien Onteniente's 2006 film Camping.

Track listings

 7" single
 "Nuit de folie" (euro remix) — 3:52
 "Tout pour la danse" — 3:15

 CD maxi
 "Nuit de folie" — 4:16
 "Tout pour la danse" — 3:14
 "Nuit de folie" (extended version) — 6:23

 12" maxi
 "Nuit de folie" (crazy night remix) — 6:40
 "Nuit de folie" (French mix club) — 6:40

 12" maxi
 "Nuit de folie" (extended version) — 6:25
 "Tout pour la danse" — 3:15
 "Nuit de folie" (a capella chœur) — 0:50
 "Nuit de folie" (a capella vois rap) — 0:40

 CD maxi - 1995 remixes
 "Nuit de folie" (dance club remix) — 6:40
 "Nuit de folie" (remix edit radio) — 3:42
 "Nuit de folie" (hard version) — 5:20
 "Nuit de folie" (space version) — 5:15

 CD single - 2000 remixes
 "Nuit de folie" (edit radio 2000) — 4:08
 "Nuit de folie" (karaoke version) — 4:09

Credits
 Original version
 Lyrics : William Picard and Claude Mainguy
 Music : Sauveur Pichot
 Production : Bel Air Studio
 Remixed by "Mixmaster" Pete Hammond
 1995 remixes
 Arranged and remixed by Rick Pier O'Neil and Yann Asting at Studio Sunday Light

Charts and sales

Weekly charts

Year-end charts

Certifications

See also
 List of number-one singles of 1988 (France)
 You're My Life

References

Songs about nights
1988 songs
1988 debut singles
Début de Soirée songs
SNEP Top Singles number-one singles
Male vocal duets
Ultratop 50 Singles (Wallonia) number-one singles
CBS Records singles